House of Chains is an epic fantasy novel by Canadian author Steven Erikson, the fourth volume of his series the Malazan Book of the Fallen. It is a direct sequel to the second volume in the series, Deadhouse Gates.

The novel was the first in the series to be published in hardback, first appearing in the United Kingdom on 2 December 2002. A mass-market paperback edition followed on 3 October 2003. The first United States edition was a hardcover published on 22 August 2006.

Plot summary

The first volume of House of Chains takes place prior to the events of the previous three books. A mighty Teblor warrior named Karsa Orlong descends from his mountain fastness on Genabackis, beginning a campaign against civilisation that leads to the deaths of his brothers and his capture by the Malazan Empire. Karsa is brought to the subcontinent of Seven Cities via a slave ship, where he befriends local rebel Leoman of the Flails. The two escape the Malazans and travel to the holy desert of Raraku to join Sha'ik, where Karsa is revealed to be the Toblakai who previously appeared in Deadhouse Gates.

The action moves forward to immediately after the events of Deadhouse Gates. The Chain of Dogs - the evacuation of 50,000 Malazan civilians across 1,500 miles of hostile territory - has ended in the tragic loss of the entire 7th army and its heroic commander, Coltaine. However,  their sacrifice has bought the lives of nearly 30,000 refugees. The Chain of Dogs has become a legend spreading across Seven Cities, cowing even those responsible for its destruction. Now, Adjunct Tavore Paran arrives in Seven Cities at the head of the 14th Army, largely consisting of untried recruits. Their mission is to advance into the heart of the Holy Desert Raraku, the very heart of the rebellion known as the Whirlwind, and destroy Sha'ik and her forces once and for all.

However, the newly instated Sha'ik is in fact Tavore's sister Felisin - a fact known only by her companion Heboric Light Touch. Though the rebels outnumber the Malazans vastly, all is not well in Sha'ik's camp. Internal conflicts threatens to destroy her army before the Malazans can, while Karsa refuses invitations from the Crippled God to become his Knight of Chains. Elsewhere, Kalam, Cutter, and Apsalar find themselves drawn into a desperate struggle for control of the Throne of Shadow, while a Tiste Edur warrior named Trull Sengar embarks on a journey across several realms with a T'lan Imass named Onrack.

The Malazan army reaches Raraku, and witnesses the disintegration of the rebel forces amidst several betrayals. An armoured Felisin is liberated from the control of the Whirlwind Goddess, but goes unrecognised by her sister and is tragically killed by her. The Malazan forces are also assisted by a ghostly army of Bridgeburners, who have achieved a state of ascendancy, and the desert of Raraku is flooded. Leoman escapes with the remnants of the rebel forces, while Karsa departs on his own journey.

In an epilogue, Trull and Onrack arrive at the First Throne - where Trull begins a story that is told in full in Midnight Tides.

Sources

External links
 
 

2002 Canadian novels
Malazan Book of the Fallen
Novels by Steven Erikson
Bantam Books books
Tor Books books